The 1955 AAA Championship Car season consisted of 11 races, beginning in Speedway, Indiana on May 30 and concluding in Phoenix, Arizona on November 6.  There was also one non-championship event in Mechanicsburg, Pennsylvania.  The AAA National Champion and Indianapolis 500 winner was Bob Sweikert. Manny Ayulo was killed at Indianapolis while practicing for the 1955 Indianapolis 500, and Bill Vukovich, the two-time defending winner, was killed in the race itself.  Jack McGrath, the two-time champion (1952, 1953), was killed in the final race at Phoenix on lap 85. This was the last year of the AAA National Championship; USAC sanctioned the series starting the next year.

Schedule and results

 Indianapolis 500 was USAC-sanctioned and counted towards the 1955 FIA World Championship of Drivers title.
 No pole is awarded for the Pikes Peak Hill Climb, in this schedule on the pole is the driver who started first. No lap led was awarded for the Pikes Peak Hill Climb, however, a lap was awarded to the drivers that completed the climb.

Final points standings

Note: The points became the car, when not only one driver led the car, the relieved driver became small part of the points. Points for driver method: (the points for the finish place) / (number the lap when completed the car) * (number the lap when completed the driver)

References

General references
 
 
 
 http://media.indycar.com/pdf/2011/IICS_2011_Historical_Record_Book_INT6.pdf  (p. 284-286)

See also
 1955 Indianapolis 500

AAA Championship Car season
AAA Championship Car
1955 in American motorsport
1955 in sports in Arizona